"'The Best of Strangers" is a song written by Kye Fleming and Dennis Morgan, and recorded by American country music artist Barbara Mandrell.  It was released in September 1980 as the second single from the album Love Is Fair.  It peaked at number 6 on the U.S. Billboard Hot Country Singles chart and number 9 on the Canadian RPM Country Tracks chart.

Chart performance

References

1980 singles
Barbara Mandrell songs
Songs written by Kye Fleming
Songs written by Dennis Morgan (songwriter)
Song recordings produced by Tom Collins (record producer)
MCA Records singles
1980 songs